Melissa Caballero (born 5 January 1985) is a Spanish former freestyle swimmer who competed in the 2004 Summer Olympics.

References

1985 births
Living people
Spanish female freestyle swimmers
Olympic swimmers of Spain
Swimmers at the 2004 Summer Olympics
European Aquatics Championships medalists in swimming
Place of birth missing (living people)